Richard Pryor is the debut album of comedian Richard Pryor. It was recorded live in 1968 at the Troubadour in West Hollywood, California. Gary Burden,  an American artist, designed the album cover which was nominated for Best Album Cover at the 12th Annual Grammy Awards.

Track listing

Album cover
Gary Burden, who designed the album cover, said Pryor wanted to do something "kind of rootsy" for the cover. Burden thought "roots" for Pryor would be some kind of tribal or African thing, so he got authentic African artifacts and weapons that fit the idea of a "tribal bushman.. Pryor said he knew of a cave right near his home in Beverly Hills that would be an ideal location for the shoot. Burden found charred sticks from a previous fire, and Pryor donned the necklace, belt, and the authentic brass nose ring, and posed with the bow and arrow for the cover.

After seeing the photos, and how primitive Pryor looked in them, Burden thought they had the look of National Geographic. Burden then enlisted his friend Rick Griffin to do artwork that resembled their magazine border, which made the cover look "totally real, like a cover of National Geographic." Burden said that as a result of the cover, he received two letters: "One was a letter from the National Geographic Society’s attorneys offering to sue me for defaming their publication. The second letter was a Grammy nomination for the best album cover." The album was later re-issued with a modified cover; the yellow border was intact, but the inner border of oak and olive leaves was replaced with the Statue of Liberty in what appears to be a lined ruler.

Review
In Scott Saul's book, Becoming Richard Pryor, Saul opined that in 1968 when Pryor was performing at the Troubadour; "he invented a style that was as far-out as Frank Zappa and as defiant as H. Rap Brown, and was catalyzed by the fusion of the two movements. On the one hand, the freewheeling ethic of the counterculture shaded Richard’s act with irony, making his more political moves seem provisional and subject to revision. On the other, the militancy of the Black Power movement sharpened his zaniness, giving it a point: his improvisations could cut you open with their poignancy or shock you with their bitterness."

See also
 The Anthology (1968–1992)

Notes

References

Further reading

External links

1968 debut albums
1968 live albums
Reprise Records live albums
1960s comedy albums
1960s spoken word albums
Live comedy albums
Spoken word albums by American artists
Albums recorded at the Troubadour
Richard Pryor live albums
Stand-up comedy albums